Paul Gerhardt Hiebert (17 July 1892 – 6 September 1987) was a Canadian writer and humorist best known for his book Sarah Binks (1947), which was awarded the Stephen Leacock Medal for Humour in 1948. A sequel, Willows Revisited was published in 1967.

Biography
Hiebert was born July 17, 1892, in Pilot Mound, Manitoba, and grew up in Altona, Manitoba, after moving there with his family at age seven. He was educated at the University of Manitoba, the University of Toronto, and McGill University. In 1942 Hiebert accepted a position as a professor of chemistry at the University of Manitoba, which he held until retiring in 1953.  At the time of his retirement he indicated that he planned to move to Carman, Manitoba, and write "important books." He died in Carman in 1987.

Bibliography
Sarah Binks (1947) 
Tower in Siloam (1966)
Willows Revisited (1967) 
Doubting Castle: A Spiritual Autobiography (1976)
For the Birds (1980)
Not as the Scribes (1984)

References

External links
Paul Hiebert's entry in The Canadian Encyclopedia
Paul Hiebert

1892 births
1987 deaths
Canadian male novelists
Mennonite writers
Mennonite humorists
People from Pilot Mound, Manitoba
Writers from Manitoba
University of Toronto alumni
Stephen Leacock Award winners
20th-century Canadian novelists
McGill University alumni
20th-century Canadian male writers
Canadian Mennonites
Canadian humorists